Tris(dimethylamino)methane (TDAM) is the simplest representative of the tris(dialkylamino)methanes of the general formula (R2N)3CH in which three of the four of methane's hydrogen atoms are replaced by dimethylamino groups (−N(CH3)2). Tris(dimethylamino)methane can be regarded as both an amine and an orthoamide.

Tris(dimethylamino)methane is a strong base and can be used as a formylation agent, as aminomethylenation reagent and as a source for the basic bis(dimethylamino)carbene of the formula (R2N)2C:.

Preparation 
Tris(dimethylamino)methane is formed in the reaction of N,N,N′,N′-Tetramethylformamidinium chloride (TMF-Cl) or bis(dimethylamino)acetonitrile with lithium dimethylamide or sodium dimethylamide with yields between 55 and 84%.

From dimethylamine and trimethoxyborane sodium dimethylamide is formed in situ in the presence of sodium hydride which reacts with N,N,N,N-tetramethylformamidinium chloride in 84% yield to tris(dimethylamino)methane and with bis(dimethylamino)acetonitrile in 77% yield.

The reaction of the dimethylformamide (DMF) dimethylacetal, HC(OCH3)2N(CH3)2, (from the DMF–dimethyl sulfate complex and sodium methoxide) with dimethylamine in the presence of the acidic catalyst 2,4,6-tri-tert-butylphenol (which is largely stable to the alkylating agent) produces tris(dimethylamino)methane.

Tris(dimethylamino)methane is formed in good yield (83%) in the reaction of DMF with tetrakis(dimethylamino)titanium(IV).

N,N,N,N,N″,N″-Hexamethylguanidinium chloride (readily obtainable by dimethylamine and N,N,N,N-tetramethylchloroformamidinium chloride derived from tetramethylurea and phosgene) forms tris(dimethylamino)methane in 53% yield under the exposure of the reducing agent sodium bis(2-methoxyethoxy)aluminum hydride (Red-Al).

Sodium hydride and trimethyl borate reduce N,N,N,N,N″,N″-hexamethylguanidinium chloride in 80% yield to tris(dimethylamino)methane.

Properties 
Tris(dimethylamino)methane is a clear, colorless or pale yellow liquid with a strong ammoniacal odor. The compound is freely miscible with many non-polar aprotic and water-free solvents. However, when heated tris(dimethylamino)methane reacts with protic solvents (such as water or alcohols) but also with weak CH-azide substances, such as acetone or acetonitrile.

Upon heating to 150–190 °C decomposition occurs with the formation of tetrakis(dimethylamino)ethene, a strong electron donor.

Applications 
Tris(dimethylamino)methane dissociates into N,N,N,N-tetramethylformamidinium cations and dimethylamide anions, which abstract protons from CH- and NH-acidic compounds. The anions thus formed add to the formamidinium cations which in turn eliminate dimethylamine and react to form dimethylaminomethylene compounds (= CH−N(CH3)2) or amidines by aminomethyleneation.

Reaction to form a methyl α-cyano-β-dimethylaminoacrylate:

Reaction to form N,N-dimethyl-N-p-nitrophenylformamidine:

Aminomethylenation provides intermediates for the synthesis of heterocycles such as pyrimidines, pyrazoles, 1,4-dihydropyridines and indoles.

N,N,N,N-Tetramethylselenourea is accessible by the extended heating of tris(dimethylamino)methane with selenium in xylene, bis(dimethylamino)carbene is suggested as an intermediate.

Related reagent
Bis(dimethylamino)methane

References 

Dimethylamino compounds